Cheung Lung Wai Estate is a public housing estate in Sheung Shui, New Territories, Hong Kong near North District Hospital. It comprises two residential blocks providing 1,358 units completed in 2015.

Houses

Demographics
According to the 2016 by-census, Cheung Lung Wai Estate had a population of 3,765. The median age was 36.9 and the majority of residents (99.5 per cent) were of Chinese ethnicity. The average household size was 2.8 people. The median monthly household income of all households (i.e. including both economically active and inactive households) was HK$16,000.

Politics
Cheung Lung Wai Estate is located in Yu Tai constituency of the North District Council. It was formerly represented by Vincent Chan Chi-fung, who was elected in the 2019 elections until July 2021.

See also

Public housing estates in Sheung Shui
Ping Kong, a nearby walled village that was named 'Cheung Lung Wai' in the past

References

Sheung Shui
Public housing estates in Hong Kong
Residential buildings completed in 2015